Delmont is an unincorporated community and census-designated place located within Maurice River Township, in Cumberland County, New Jersey, United States. The area is served as United States Postal Service ZIP code 08314. It was first listed as a CDP in the 2020 census with a population of 122.

The community was founded by European settlers in 1770. Until 1891, it was called Ewings Neck. The Ewing family was one of the first to settle in the area and a "neck" is a name often given to a stretch of higher ground surrounded by marshes and low-lands.

The New Jersey Department of Corrections Southern State Correctional Facility is in the Delmont area of the township.

Demographics

Historic structures
 Delmont's post office was established in 1851; mail first came by stagecoach and later by train after the Cape May and Millville Railroad opened in 1863.
 Delmont's first church was a one-room wooden structure which also served as the village's first school.
 Delmont United Methodist Church was built in 1872. The aging structure received renovations in Fall 2010 with the help of thousands of dollars worth of donations from churchgoers and local businesses.
 Delmont School – a two-story wood-frame structure – was built in 1887. It was demolished in the summer of 2006 in order to make way for the town's first park.

References

External links

 Census 2000 Fact Sheet for ZIP Code Tabulation Area 08314 from the United States Census Bureau

Maurice River Township, New Jersey
Census-designated places in Cumberland County, New Jersey
Census-designated places in New Jersey
Unincorporated communities in Cumberland County, New Jersey
Unincorporated communities in New Jersey